Sir Allan Perry (born 17 April 1860) was surgeon major, principal civil medical officer, and inspector general of hospitals in Ceylon. He was knighted in London in 1904.

References 

19th-century British medical doctors
Alumni of Durham University
Royal Army Medical Corps officers
Knights Bachelor
1860 births
Year of death missing
People from British Ceylon
Sri Lankan people of British descent